Ellabella chalazombra is a moth in the Copromorphidae family. It is found in China (Yunnan).

The length of the forewings is 10–11 mm for males and 10.5 mm for females. The basal part of the forewings is white-tan, irrorated with brown spots and tawny suffusion. The hindwings are grey-brown. Adults are on wing from June to July.

References

Natural History Museum Lepidoptera generic names catalog

Copromorphidae
Moths described in 1938